In mathematics the Watson quintuple product identity is an infinite product identity introduced by  and rediscovered by  and . It is analogous to the Jacobi triple product identity, and is the Macdonald identity for a certain non-reduced affine root system. It is related to Euler's pentagonal number theorem.

Statement

References

 Foata, D., & Han, G. N. (2001). The triple, quintuple and septuple product identities revisited. In The Andrews Festschrift (pp. 323–334). Springer, Berlin, Heidelberg.
 Cooper, S. (2006). The quintuple product identity. International Journal of Number Theory, 2(01), 115-161.

Further reading
 Subbarao, M. V., & Vidyasagar, M. (1970). On Watson’s quintuple product identity. Proceedings of the American Mathematical Society, 26(1), 23-27.
 Hirschhorn, M. D. (1988). A generalisation of the quintuple product identity. Journal of the Australian Mathematical Society, 44(1), 42-45.
 Alladi, K. (1996). The quintuple product identity and shifted partition functions. Journal of Computational and Applied Mathematics, 68(1-2), 3-13.
 Farkas, H., & Kra, I. (1999). On the quintuple product identity. Proceedings of the American Mathematical Society, 127(3), 771-778.
 Chen, W. Y., Chu, W., & Gu, N. S. (2005). Finite form of the quintuple product identity. arXiv preprint math/0504277.

Elliptic functions
Theta functions
Mathematical identities
Theorems in number theory
Infinite products